Manuel Jorge Neves Moreira de Sousa (born 18 June 1975) is a Portuguese international football referee who  has been active internationally since 2006.

References

1975 births
Living people
Portuguese football referees
Sportspeople from Porto